Romanów  is an unincorporated village in the administrative district of Gmina Kamienica Polska, within Częstochowa County, Silesian Voivodeship, in southern Poland.

The village has a population of 308.

References

Villages in Częstochowa County